Moisés García may refer to:

Moisés García (footballer, born 1971), Spanish footballer
Moisés García (footballer, born 1989), Spanish footballer